San Lorenzo is a municipality in the San Marcos department of Guatemala. It was founded in 1812 year by Spanish families.

This is the birthplace of Justo Rufino Barrios-who served as President of Guatemala from 1873 until his death in 1885 and whose native house has been declared as a National Heritage.

Tourism

San Lorenzo's most representative historic landmark is "Justo Rufino Barrios" hacienda, birthplace of general Barrios and named National Heritage by the government.

Climate

San Lorenzo has temperate climate (Köppen: Cwb).

Geographic location

It is located 23 km West of San Marcos, the department capital, and is surrounded by San Marcos municipalities.

See also

 La Aurora International Airport
 Tapachula International Airport

References

External links
Official website

Municipalities of the San Marcos Department